River Hill may refer to:
River Hill, California
River Hill, Columbia, Maryland
River Hill High School, in Maryland
River Hill, Kent (215 m), a hill in Kent, England

See also
River Hills (disambiguation)